Dave Thomas Circle is the unofficial nickname for a small triangular block in Northeast Washington, D.C., and the surrounding streets and traffic pattern. It is bounded by Florida Avenue, New York Avenue and First Street Northeast, with O Street Northeast and Eckington Place Northeast also terminating along the block. It is located on the eastern edge of the L'Enfant Plan.

Background

The circle is a result of a gap in the original L'Enfant Plan. The plan ended where east-west O Street and north-south First Street reached Boundary Street (now Florida Avenue), where they met Tiber Creek, which was eventually buried and culverted over. As development increased over time, traffic congestion increased. Until 2021, the only property on the block was a Wendy's fast food restaurant franchise and its parking lot, leading to the unofficial Dave Thomas Circle name, after the late Dave Thomas, who founded Wendy's in 1969 and served as its long-time spokesman.

A 2010 project by the city's Department of Transportation made each of the streets one-way around the block, similar to a traffic circle. The department calls the traffic pattern a "virtual circle." In 2019, Washington, D.C. Mayor Muriel Bowser asked for $35 million for the city to buy the Wendy's and reconfigure the intersection to eliminate Dave Thomas Circle and make it better for motorists, pedestrians and bicyclists.

In 2021, the District Department of Transportation acquired the Wendy's restaurant and property through eminent domain to enable the city to demolish the building, rebuild the intersection and eliminate the circle, with the exact design yet to be determined. The city plans to start construction in early 2022. The restaurant closed on September 21, 2021, with the franchisee vacating the building fully by September 30.

References

Northeast (Washington, D.C.)
Squares, plazas, and circles in Washington, D.C.